This is a list of brachiopod genera which includes both extinct (fossil) forms and extant (living) genera (bolded). Names are according to the conventions of the International Code of Zoological Nomenclature.

A

Aalenirhynchia
Aberia
Aboriginella
Abrekia
Absenticosta
Abyssorhynchia
Abyssothyris
Acambona
Acanthalosia
Acanthambonia
Acanthatia
Acanthobasiliola
Acanthocosta
Acanthocrania
Acanthoglypha
Acanthoplecta
Acanthoproductus
Acanthorhynchia
Acanthorthis
Acanthospirifer
Acanthospirina
Acanthothyris
Acanthothyropsis
Acanthotoechia
Acareorthis
Acculina
Achunoproductus
Acidotocarena
Acolosia
Acosarina
Acritosia
Acrobelesia (fossil per IRMNG)
Acrobrochus
Acrospirifer
Acrothele
Acrothyra
Acrothyris
Acrotreta
Acrotretella
Actinoconchus
Actinomena
Acuminothyris
Acutatheca
Acutella
Acutilineolus
Acutoria
Adairia
Adaptatrypa
Adectorhynchus
Adenus
Adiaphragma
Adminiculoria
Admixtella
Admodorugosus
Adnatida
Adolfia
Adolfispirifer
Adrenia
Advenina
Adygella
Adygelloides
Adygellopsis
Aegiria
Aegironites
Aemula
Aenigmastricklandia
Aenigmastrophia
Aenigmathyris
Aequispiriferina
Aerithyris
Aerothyris
Aesopomum
Aetheia
Aethirhynchia
Afghanospirifer
Afilasma
Agarhyncha
Agastapleura
Agelesia
Agerinella
Agramatia
Agulhasia
Agyrekia
Ahtiella
Aidynkulirhynchia
Airtonia
Ajukuzella
Akatchania
Akelina
Akopovorhynchia
Aktassia
Alabusherothyris
Alaskospira
Alatiformia
Alatoproductus
Alatorthotetina
Aldaniopirifer
Aldanotreta
Aldingia
Alekseevaella
Alexenia
Alichovia
Aliconchidium
Alimbella
Alipunctifera
Aliquantula
Alisina
Alispira
Alispirifer
Alispiriferella
Alitaria
Alithyris
Allanella
Allanetes
Allorhynchoides
Allorhynchus
Almerarhynchia
Almorhynchia
Altaeorthis
Altaestrophia
Altaethyrella
Altajella
Altiplecus
Altoplicatella
Altunella
Alvarezites
Alwynia
Ambardella
Ambikella
Ambocoelia
Amboglossa
Ambonorthella
Ambothyris
Amerista
Amesopleura
Ametoria
Amictocracens
Amissopecten
Amoenirhynchia
Amoenospirifer
Amosina
Amphiclina
Amphiclinodonta
Amphigenia
Amphipella
Amphiplecia
Amphistrophia
Amphistrophiella
Amphithyris
Amphitomella
Amsdenella
Amsdenina
Amsdenostropiella
Amurothyris
Amydroptychus
Amygdalocosta
Anabaia
Anabaria
Anabolotreta
Anadyrella
Anakinetica
Anaptychius
Anarhynchia
Anastrophia
Anathyrella
Anathyris
Anatreta
Anatrypa
Anazyga
Anchigonites
Ancillotoechia
Ancistrocrania
Ancistrorhynchia
Ancorellina
Ancorhynchia
Ancylostrophia
Andalucinetes
Andobolus
Andreaspira
Aneboconcha
Anechophragma
Anelotreta
Anemonaria
Angarella
Angiospirifer
Angulotreta
Angusticardinia
Angustothyris
Aniabrochus
Anidanthus
Animonithyris
Anisactinella
Anisopleurella
Annuloplatidia
Anomactinella
Anomalesia
Anomaloglossa
Anomaloria
Anomalorthis
Anoplia
Anopliopsis
Anoplotheca
Anoptambonites
Ansehia
Antelocoelia
Anteridocus
Antezeilleria
Anthracospirifer
Antigonambonites
Antigoniarcula
Antinomia
Antiptychina
Antiquatonia
Antirhynchonella
Antispirifer
Antistrix
Antistrixia
Antizygospira
Antronaria
Anulatrypa
Anx
Aorhynchia
Aparimarhynchia
Apatecosia
Apatobolus
Apatomorpha
Apatorthis
Apatoskenidioides
Aperispirifer
Apertirhynchella
Aphanomena
Aphaurosia
Apheathyris
Aphelesia
Aphelotreta
Apheoorthina
Apheoorthis
Aphragmus
Apicilirella
Apletosia
Apodosia
Apollonorthis
Apomatella
Apopentamerus
Aporthophyla
Aporthophylina
Apothyris
Apousiella
Apringia
Apsilingula
Apsocalymma
Apsotreta
Arabatia
Arabicella
Araksalosia
Araneatrypa
Arapsopleurum
Araspirifer
Aratanea
Aratella
Aratoechia
Araxathyris
Araxilevis
Arbizustrophia
Arcelinithyris
Arceythyris
Archaeorthis
Archaiosteges
Archeochonetes
Arcosarina
Arcticalosia
Arctireta
Arctispira
Arctochonetes
Arctohedra
Arctomeristina
Arctosia (fossil per IRMNG)
Arctothyris
Arcualla
Arcuatothyris
Arcullina
Ardiviscus
Ardmosteges
Arduspirifer
Areella
Arenaciarcula
Arenorthis
Areostrophia
Argella
Argentiproductus
Argorhynx
Argovithyris
Argyrotheca
Arionthia
Arktikina
Aromasithyris
Articalosia
Artimyctella
Artiotreta
Artospirifer
Aseptagypa
Aseptalium
Aseptella
Aseptirhynchia
Aseptonetes
Asiarhynchia
Asioproductus
Askepasma
Asperlinus
Aspidothyris
Aspinosella
Astaristrophia
Astegosia
Astraborthis
Astua
Asturorthis
Astutorhyncha
Asymmetrochonetes
Asymphylotoechia
Asyrinx
Asyrinxia
Atactosia
Atelelasma
Atelelasmoidea
Atelestegastus
Atelithyris
Athabaschia
Athyrhynchus
Athyris
Athyrisina
Athyrisinoides
Athyrisinopsis
Athyrorhynchia
Atlanticocoelia
Atlantida
Atribonium
Atrypa
Atryparia
Atrypella
Atrypellina
Atrypina
Atrypinella
Atrypinopsis
Atrypoidea
Atrypopsis
Atrypunculus
Atrythyris
Attenuatella
Auchmerella
Aucklandirhynchia
Aulacatrypa
Aulacella
Aulacorphora
Aulacothyris
Aulacothyroides
Aulacothyropsis
Aulidospira
Aulie
Aulites
Aulonotreta
Auloprotonia
Aulosteges
Auricolispina
Austinella
Australiarcula
Australina
Australirhynchia
Australispira
Australocoelia
Australosia
Australospirifer
Australostrophia
Austriellula
Austrirhynchia
Austrochoristites
Austrohedra
Austronoplia
Austrospirifer
Austrothyris
Avisyrinx
Avonia
Avonothyris
Axiodeaneia
Azamella
Azygidium

B

Babinia Racheboeuf & Branisa, 1985
Babukella
Backhausina
Bactrynium
Badainjarania
Baeorhynchia
Bagnorthis
Bagrasia
Bailongjiangella
Baissalosteges
Bajanhongorella
Bajanorthis
Bajarinovia
Bajtugania
Bakonyithyris
Balakhonia
Balanoconcha
Balatonspira
Balkhasheconcha
Bancroftina
Bandoproductus
Baranovus = Obscurella Baranov, 1991 (preoccupied)
Barbaestrophia
Barbarorthis
Barbarothyris
Barbatulella
Barkolia
Barrandina
Barroisella
Barunkhuraya
Barzellinia
Bashkiria
Basilicorhynchus
Basiliola
Basiliolella
Bateridium
Baterospirifer
Bathymyonia
Bathynanus
Bathyrhyncha
Baturria
Bazardarella
Beachia
Beckmannia
Becsia
Beecheria
Beichuanella
Beichuanrhynchus
Beitaia
Bejrutella
Bekkeromena
Belbekella
Beleutella
Bellaclathrus
Bellimurina
Belothyris
Bergalaria
Beschevella
Betterbergia
Biarea
Bibatiola
Bicarinatina
Bicepsirhynchia
Bicia
Biconostrophia
Biconvexiella
Bicuspina
Bidentatus
Biernatella
Biernatia
Biernatium
Bifida
Bifolium
Bihendulirhynchia
Bihenithyris
Bilaminella
Billingsella
Bilobia
Bilotina
Bimuria
Biparetis
Biplatyconcha
Biplicatoria
Birchsella
Bisculcata
Biseptum
Bisinocoelia
Bistramia
Bisulcina
Bitternella
Bittnerella
Bleshidium
Blyskavomena
Bobinella
Bodrakella
Bohemiella
Bohemirhynchia
Boicinetes
Bojodouvillina
Bojothyris
Bolgarithyris
Bolilaspirifer
Bomina
Boonderella
Booralia
Boreadocamara
Boreadorthis
Borealirhynchia
Borealis
Boreiospira
Boreiothyris
Bornhardtina
Borua
Bosquetella
Bothrionia
Bothrostegium
Bothrothyris
Boticum
Botsfordia
Boubeithyris
Bouchardia (fossil per IRMNG)
Bouchardiella
Boucotella
Boucotia
Boucotides
Boucotinskia
Boucotstrophia
Bowanorthis
Bozshakolia
Brachymimulus
Brachyprion
Brachyspirifer
Brachythyrina
Brachythyrinella
Brachythyris
Brachyzyga
Bracteoleptaena
Bradfordirhynchia
Brahimorthis
Brandysia
Branikia
Brantonites
Brasilioproductus
Breileenia
Brevicamera
Brevilamnulella
Brevipelta
Breviseptum
Brevispirifer
Brimethyris
Brochocarina
Broeggeria
Bronnothyris
Brooksina
Browneella
Brunnirhyncha
Bryorhynchus
Bucequia
Buchanathyris
Buckmanithyris
Bulahdelia
Bullarina
Bullothyris
Buntoxia
Burmirhynchia
Burovia
Burrirhynchia
Busulcata
Butkovia
Buxtonia
Buxtoniella
Buxtonioides
Bynguanoia
Bystromena

C

Cacemia
Cactosteges
Cadomella
Cadudium
Caenanoplia
Caenotreta
Caeroplecia
Calcirhynchia
Caledorhynchia
Callaiaspida
Callicalyptella
Calliglypha
Calliomarginatia
Callipentamerus
Callipleura
Calliprotonia
Callispirifer
Callispirina
Calloria
Callospiriferina
Callytharrella
Calpella
Calvinaria
Calvirhynchia
Calvustrigis
Calyptolepta
Calyptoria
Camarelasma
Camarium
Camarophorella
Camarophorina
Camarophorinella
Camarospira
Camarothyridina
Camarotoechia
Camarotoechiodes
Cambrotrophia
Camerella
Camerisma
Camerophorina
Camerothyris
Campages
Campylorthis
Canadospira
Canalitatus
Canavirila
Cancellospirifer
Cancellothyris
Cancrinella
Cancrinelloides
Candispirifer
Cantabriella
Canthylotreta
Capelliniella
Capillarina
Capillirhynchia
Capillirostra
Capillispirifer
Capillithyris
Capillomesolobus
Capillonia
Caplinoplia
Carapezzia
Caratrypa
Carbocyrtina
Cardiarina
Cardinirhynchia
Cardinocrania
Cardiothyris
Caricula
Carinagypa
Carinatina
Carinatinella
Carinatothyris
Carinatrypa
Cariniferella
Carinokoninckina
Carlinia
Carneithyris
Carolirhynchia
Carpatothyris
Carpinaria
Carringtonia
Carteridina
Cartorhium
Caryogyps
Caryona
Caryorhynchus
Casquella
Cassianospira
Cassidirostrum
Castellaroina
Catacephalus
Catazyga
Cathaysia
Caucasella
Caucasiproductus
Caucasoproductus
Caucasorhynchia
Caucasothyris
Cavatisinurostrum
Cedulia
Celdobolus
Celebetes
Celidocrania
Celsifornix
Celtanoplia
Cenorhynchia
Centronella
Centronelloidea
Ceocypea
Ceramisia
Cerasina
Ceratreta
Cerberatrypa
Cererithyris
Chaeniorhynchus
Chaganella
Chalimochonetes
Changshaispirifer
Changtangella
Changyangrhynchus
Chaoiella
Chaoina
Chapadella
Chapinella
Charionella
Charionoides
Charltonithyris
Chascothyris
Chathamithyris
Chattertonia
Chatwinothyris
Chaulistomella
Cheirothyris
Cheirothyropsis
Chelononia
Cheniothyris
Chenxianoproductus
Cherkesovaena
Cherubicornea
Chianella
Chile
Chilianshania
Chilidiopsis
Chilidorthis
Chimaerothyris
Chivatschella
Chlidonophora
Chlupacina
Chlupacitoechia
Chnaurocoelia
Choanodus
Chondronia
Chonetella
Chonetes
Chonetina
Chonetinella
Chonetinetes
Chonetipustula
Chonetoidea
Chonopectella
Chonopectoides
Chonopectus
Chonosteges
Chonostegoidella
Chonostegoides
Chonostrophia
Chonostrophiella
Choperella
Choristitella
Choristites
Choristothyris
Christianella (brachiopod)
Christiania
Chrustenopora
Chynistrophia
Cillinella
Cimicinella
Cimicinoides
Cincinnetina
Cincta
Cinctifera
Cinctopsis
Cinerorthis
Cingolospiriferina
Cingulella
Cingulodermis
Cirpa
Cistellarcula
Claratrypa
Clarkeia
Clarkella
Clathrithyris
Clavigera
Clavodalejina
Cleiothyridina
Cliftonia
Clinambon
Clintonella
Clistotrema
Clitambonites
Clivospirifer
Clorinda
Clorindella
Clorindina
Clorindinella
Cloudella
Cloudothyris
Cnismatocentrum
Coelospira
Coelospirella
Coelospirina
Coeloterorhynchus
Coenothyris
Colaptomena
Coledium
Colinella
Collarothyris
Collemataria
Colletostracia
Collinithyris
Collumatus
Colongina
Colophragma
Colosia
Colpotoria
Columellithyris
Comatopoma
Comelicania
Comiotoechia
Companteris
Composita
Compositella
Compressoproductus
Compsothyris
Comuquia
Conarosia
Conarothyris
Conchidium
Concinnispirifer
Concinnithyris
Conispirifer
Connectoproductus
Conodiscus
Conomimus
Conotreta
Contradouvillinia
Convexothyris
Coolinia
Cooperina
Cooperispira
Cooperithyris
Cooperrhynchia
Coptothyris
Corbicularia
Cordatomyonia
Corineorthis
Coriothyris
Cornwallia
Coronalosia
Corrugatimediorostrum
Cortezorthis
Corvinopugnax
Corylispirifer
Coscinarina
Coscinophora
Costachonetes
Costacranaena
Costalosiella
Costanoplia
Costatispirifer
Costatrypa
Costatumulus
Costellarina
Costellirostra
Costellispirifer
Costicrura
Costiferina
Costinorella
Costirhynchia
Costisorthis
Costispinifera
Costispirifer
Costispiriferina
Costisteges
Costistricklandia
Costistrophomena
Costistrophonella
Costitrimerella
Costoconcha
Craigella
Cranaena
Crania
Craniops
Craniotreta
Craniscus
Craspedalosia
Craspedelia
Craspedona
Crassatrypa
Crassipunctatrypa
Crassumbo
Cratispirifer
Cratorhynchonella
Cratospirifer
Cremnorthis
Crenispirifer
Cretirhynchia
Cricosia
Crinisaria
Crinisarina
Crinistrophia
Cristicoma
Cristiferina
Cromatrypa
Crossacanthia
Crossalosia
Crossiskenidium
Crozonorthis
Cruralina
Cruratula
Cruricella
Crurirhynchia
Crurispina
Crurithyris
Cryptacanthia
Cryptatrypa
Cryptonella
Cryptopora
Cryptoporella
Cryptorhynchia
Cryptospirifer
Cryptothyris
Cryptotreta
Ctenalosia
Ctenochonetes
Ctenokoninckina
Cubacula
Cubanirhynchia
Cubanothyris
Cudmorella
Cuersithyris
Cumberlandina
Cuneirhynchia
Cuparius
Cupularostrum
Curticia
Curtirhynchia
Cycladigera
Cyclantharia
Cyclocoelia
Cyclomyonia
Cyclorhynchia
Cyclospira
Cyclothyris
Cymatorhynchia
Cymbidium
Cymbistropheodonta
Cymbithyris
Cymbricia
Cymidia
Cymoproductus
Cymostrophia
Cyndalia
Cyphomena
Cyphomenoidea
Cyphotalosia
Cyphoterorhynchus
Cyranoia
Cyrbasiotreta
Cyrolexis
Cyrtalosia
Cyrtella
Cyrtia
Cyrtina
Cyrtinaella
Cyrtinoides
Cyrtinopsis
Cyrtiopsis
Cyrtiorina
Cyrtoniscus
Cyrtonotella
Cyrtonotreta
Cyrtospirifer
Cyrtothyris
Cystothyris

D

Dabashanospira
Dactylogonia
Dactylotreta
Daghanirhynchia
Dagnachonetes
Dagysorhynchia
Dagyspirifer
Dalaia
Dalejina
Dalejodiscus
Dalerhynchus
Dalinuria
Dalligas
Dallina
Dallinella
Dallithyris
Dalmanella
Dalmanellopsis
Danella
Danzania
Darvasia
Dasyalosia
Dasysaria
Datangia
Davidsonella
Davidsonia
Davidsoniatrypa
Davidsonina
Daviesiella
Davinirhynchia
Davoustia
Dawsonelloides
Dayia
Dearbornia
Decoropugnax
Decurtella
Dedzetina
Delepinea
Deltachania
Deltarhynchia
Deltarina
Delthyris
Deltospirifer
Demonedys
Dengalosia
Densalvus
Densepustula
Denticuliphoria
Dentospiriferina
Derbyella
Derbyia
Derbyina
Derbyoides
Dereta
Desatrypa
Desistrophia
Desmoinesia
Desmorthis
Desquamatia
Devonalosia
Devonamphistrophia
Devonaria
Devonochonetes
Devonoproductus
Diabolirhynchia
Diambonia
Diambonioidea
Diandongia
Diaphelasma
Diaphragmus
Diazoma
Dicamara
Dicamaropsis
Dicellomus
Diceromyonia
Dichacaenia
Dichospirifer
Dichozygopleura
Dicoelosia
Dicoelospirifer
Dicoelostrophia
Dicondylotreta
Dictyobolus
Dictyoclostoidea
Dictyoclostus
Dictyonina
Dictyonites
Dictyostrophia
Dictyothyris
Dictyothyropsis
Dicystoconcha
Didymelasma
Didymoparcium
Didymothyris
Diedrothyris
Dielasma
Dielasmella
Dielasmina
Dienope
Dierisma
Diestothyris
Dignomia
Digonella
Dihelictera
Diholkorhynchia
Dilophosina
Dimegelasma
Dimensionaequalirostrum
Dimerella
Dinarella
Dinarispira
Dinobolus
Dinorthis
Diochthofera
Dioristella
Diorthelasma
Diparelasma
Diplanus
Diplonorthis
Diplospirella
Dipunctella
Diraphora
Dirinus
Discina
Discinisca
Discradisca
Discinopsis
Discomyorthis
Discotreta
Discradisca
Disculina
Disphenia
Dispiriferina
Dissoria
Disulcatella
Ditreta
Divaricosta
Dixonella
Dmitria
Dmitrispirifer
Dnestrina
Doescherella
Dogdathyris
Dogdoa
Doleroides
Dolerorthis
Dolichobrochus
Dolichomocelypha
Dolichosina
Dolichozygus
Doloresella
Domokhotia
Donalosia
Donella
Dongbaella
Dongbeiispirifer
Donispirifer
Dorashamia
Dorsirugatia
Dorsisinus
Dorsoplicathyris
Dorsoscyphus
Dorytreta
Douvillina
Douvillinaria
Douvillinella
Douvillinoides
Douvinella
Dowhatania
Drabodiscina
Draborthis
Drabovia
Drabovinella
Dracius
Drahanorhynchus
Drahanostrophia
Drepanorhyncha
Droharhynchia
Druganirhynchia
Drummackina
Duartea
Dubaria
Dubioleptina
Dulankarella
Dundrythyris
Duryeella
Dushanirhynchia
Dyoros
Dyschrestia
Dyscolia
Dyscritosia (fossil per IRMNG)
Dyscritothyris
Dysedrosia (fossil per IRMNG)
Dysoristus
Dysprosorthis
Dyticospirifer
Dzhangirhynchia
Dzhebaglina
Dzieduszyckia
Dzirulina

E

Eatonia
Eatonioides
Eccentricosta
Echinalosia
Echinaria
Echinariella
Echinauris
Echinirhynchia
Echinocoelia
Echinocoeliopsis
Echinoconchella
Echinoconchus
Echinospirifer
Echinosteges
Echyrosia
Ecnomiosa
Ectenoglossa
Ectochoristites
Ectoposia
Ectorensselandia
Ectorhipidium
Ectyphoria
Edreja
Edriosteges
Ehlersella
Eichwaldia
Eifelatrypa
Eifyris
Eilotreta
Ejnespirifer
Elasmata
Elasmothyris
Elderra
Elegesta
Elenchus
Eleutherocrania
Eleutherokomma
Eliorhynchus
Elita
Eliva
Elivella
Elivina
Elkania
Elkanisca
Ella
Ellassonia
Elliottella
Elliottina
Elliptoglossa
Elliptostrophia
Elmaria
Elymospirifer
Elythina
Emanuella
Embolosia
Emeithyris
Enallosia
Enallothecidea
Enantiosphen
Enantiosphenella
Enchodrospirifer
Endospirifer
Endothyris
Endrea
Engenella
Enigmalosia
Ense
Entacanthadus
Enteletella
Enteletes
Enteletina
Eoamphistrophia
Eoanastrophia
Eoantiptychia
Eobiernatella
Eobrachythyrina
Eobrachythyris
Eochonetes
Eochoristitella
Eochoristites
Eocoelia
Eoconcha
Eoconchidium
Eoconulus
Eocramatia
Eodallina
Eodalmanella
Eodevonaria
Eodictyonella (formerly Dictyonella)
Eodinobolus
Eodiorthelasma
Eodmitria
Eoglossinotoechia
Eogryphus
Eohemithiris
Eohowellella
Eokarpinskia
Eokirkidium
Eolaballa
Eolacazella
Eolissochonetes
Eolyttonia
Eomaoristrophia
Eomarginifera
Eomartiniopsis
Eomegastrophia
Eonalivkinia
Eoorthis
Eoparaphorhynchus
Eopholidostrophia
Eoplectodonta
Eoplicanoplia
Eoplicoplasia
Eoproductella
Eopugnax
Eoreticularia
Eorhipidomella
Eoscaphelasma
Eoschizophoria
Eoschuchertella
Eoseptaliphoria
Eosericoidea
Eosiphonotreta
Eosophragmophora
Eosotrematorthis
Eospinatrypa
Eospirifer
Eospiriferina
Eospirigerina
Eostrophalosia
Eostropheodonta
Eostrophomena
Eostrophonella
Eosyringothyris
Eothecidellina
Eothele
Eousella
Epelidoaegiria
Ephippelasma
Epicelia
Epicyrta
Epithyris
Epithyroides
Epitomyonia
Equirostra
Erectocephalus
Eremithyris
Eremotoechia
Eremotrema
Ericiatia
Eridmatus
Eridorthis
Erinostrophia
Eripnifera
Erismatina
Eristenosia
Ernogia
Errhynx
Erymnia
Erymnaria
Esilia
Espella
Estlandia
Estonirhynchia
Etheridgina
Etymothyris
Eucalathis
Eucharitina
Eudesella
Eudesia
Eudesites
Eudoxina
Euidothyris
Eumetabolotoechia
Eumetria
Euorthisina
Euractinella
Eurekaspirifer
Euroatrypa
Eurorthisina
Eurycolporhynchus
Eurypthyris
Eurysina
Eurysites
Eurysoria
Euryspirifer
Eurythyris
Eurytreta
Euxinella
Evagyrotheca
Evanescirostrum
Evanidisinurostrum
Evenkina
Evenkinorthis
Evenkorhynchia
Exatrypa
Excavatorhynchia
Exceptothyris
Expellobolus
Experilingula

F

Faksethyris
Falafer
Falciferula
Fallax
Fallaxispirifer
Fallaxoproductus
Falsatrypa
Famatinorthis
Fanichonetes
Fardenia
Fascicoma
Fascicosta
Fascicostella
Fasciculina
Fascifera
Fascistropheodonta
Fascizetina
Fehamya
Felinotoechia
Fenestrirostra
Fengzuella
Fenxiangella
Ferganella
Ferganoproductus
Fernglenia
Ferrax
Ferrobolus
Ferrythyris
Fezzanoglossa
Ffynnonia
Fibulistrophia
Fidespirifer
Filiatrypa
Filiconcha
Filigreenia
Fimbriaria
Fimbrinia
Fimbriothyris
Fimbrispirifer
Finkelnburgia
Finospirifer
Fissirhynchia
Fistulogonites
Fitzroyella
Flabellirhynchia
Flabellitesia
Flabellocyrtia
Flabellothyris
Flabellulirostrum
Flectcherithyris
Fletcherina
Fletcherithyroides
Flexaria
Flexathyris
Floweria
Fluctuaria
Foliomena
Fordinia
Formosarhynchia
Fortunella
Fosteria
Fossatrypa
Foveola
Frankiella
Frechella
Fredericksia
Frenula
Frenulina
Frieleia
Fulcriphoria
Furcirhynchia
Furcitella
Fusella
Fusichonetes
Fusiproductus
Fusirhynchia
Fusispirifer

G

Gacella
Gacina
Galataestrophia
Galeatathyris
Galeatella
Galeatellina
Galeoatagypa
Galliennithyris
Gamonetes
Gamphalosia
Gasconsia
Gashaomiaoia
Gastrodetoechia
Gefonia
Gegenella
Gelidorthidina
Gelidorthis
Gemerithyris
Gemmarcula
Gemmellaroia
Gemmellaroialla
Gemmulicosta
Geniculifera
Geniculigypa
Geniculina
Geniculomclearnites
Georgethyris
Geranocephalus
Gerassimovia
Gerkispira
Gerolsteinites
Gerothyris
Gerrhynx
Geyerella
Gibberostrophia
Gibbirhynchia
Gibbithyris
Gibbochonetes
Gibbospirifer
Gigantoproductus
Gigantorhynchus
Gigantothyris
Gilledia
Giraldiella
Girlasia
Girtyella
Gisilina
Gissarina
Gjelispinifera
Glabrichonetina
Glaciarcula
Gladiostrophia
Glaphyorthis
Glassia
Glassina
Glazewskia
Glendonia
Globatrypa
Globiella
Globirhynchia
Globispirifer
Globithyris
Globosobucina
Globosochonetes
Globosoproductus
Globulirhynchia
Glossella
Glosseudesia
Glosshypothyridina
Glossinotoechia
Glossinulina
Glossinulirhynchia
Glossinulus
Glossoleptaena
Glossorthis
Glossothyropsis
Glottidia
Glyphisaria
Glyptacrothrele
Glyptambonites
Glypterina
Glyptias
Glyptoglossella
Glyptogypa
Glyptomena
Glyptorhynchia
Glyptoria
Glyptorthis
Glyptosteges
Glyptotrophia
Glytospirifer
Gmelinmagas
Gnathorhynchia
Goleomixa
Goliathyris
Gonambonites
Gonathyris
Gondolina
Goniarina
Goniobrochus (fossil per IRMNG)
Goniophoria
Goniorhynchia
Goniothyris
Goniothyropsis
Goniotrema
Gorgostrophia
Gorjanskya
Gorystrophia
Gotatrypa
Goungjunspirifer
Gracianella
Gracilotoechia
Grammetaria
Grammoplecia
Grammorhynchus
Grandaurispina
Grandiproductella
Grandirhynchia
Grantonia
Granulirhynchia
Grasirhynchia
Grayina
Greenfieldia
Grorudia
Gruenewaldtia
Grumantia
Gruntia = Boloria Grunt, 1973 (preoccupied)
Gruntallina
Gryphus
Guangdangina
Guangjiayanella
Guangshunia
Guangxiispirifer
Guaxa
Gubleria
Guicyrtia
Guilinospirifer
Guistrophia
Guizhovella
Gunnarella
Gunningblandella
Gusarella
Guttasella
Gwynia
Gwyniella
Gypidula
Gypidulella
Gypidulina
Gypiduloides
Gypospirifer
Gyroselenella
Gyrosina
Gyrosoria
Gyrothyris

H

Habrobrochus
Hadrorhynchia
Hadrosia
Hadrotorhynchus
Hadrotreta
Hadyrhyncha
Hagabirhynchia
Hallina
Hallinetes
Halorella
Halorellina
Halorelloidea
Hamburgia
Hamlingella
Hamptonina
Hanaeproductus
Hansotreta
Hanusatrypa
Haplospirifer
Harknessella
Harmatosia
Harpidium
Harttella
Haupiria
Havlicekella
Havlicekia
Haydenella
Haydenoides
Hebertella
Hebetoechia
Hedeina
Hedeinopsis
Hedstroemina
Heimia
Helaspis
Helenathyris
Heleniproductus
Heligothyris
Helmersenia
Helvetella
Hemichonetes
Hemileurus
Hemiplethorhynchus
Hemipronites
Hemiptychina
Hemistringocephalus
Hemithiris
Hemithyropsis
Hemitoechia
Heosomocelypha
Herangirhynchia
Hercosestria
Hercosia
Hercostrophia
Hercothyris
Hergetatrypa
Hesperinia
Hesperithyris
Hesperomena
Hesperonomia
Hesperonomiella
Hesperorhynchia
Hesperorthis
Hesperosia
Hesperotrophia
Hessenhausia
Heteralosia
Heteraria
Heterelasma
Heterobrochus
Heteromychus
Heterorthella
Heterorthina
Heterorthis
Hibernodonta
Himalairhynchia
Himathyris
Hindella
Hinganella
Hingganoleptaena
Hipparionix
Hircinisca
Hirnantia
Hirsutella
Hiscobeccus
Hisingerella
Hispanirhynchia
Hispidaria
Histosyrinx
Holcorhynchella
Holcorhynchia
Holcospirifer
Holcothyris
Hollardiella
Hollardina
Holobrachia
Holorhynchus
Holosia
Holotricharina
Holtedahlina
Holynatrypa
Holynetes
Homaliarhynchia
Homeocardiorhynchus
Homeorhynchia
Homevalaria
Homoeospira
Homoeospirella
Homotreta
Hontorialosia
Horderleyella
Horridonia
Hoskingia
Hostimex
Howellella
Howellites
Howelloidea
Howittia
Howseia
Huatangia
Hubeiproductus
Huenella
Huenellina
Hulterstadia
Humaella
Hunanochonetes
Hunanoproductus
Hungarispira
Hungaritheca
Hustedia
Hustedtiella
Hyattidina
Hyborhynchella
Hybostenoscisma
Hybostenoscisma
Hynniphoria
Hyperobolus
Hypoleiorhynchus
Hypolinoproductus
Hyponeatrypa
Hypopsia
Hypothyridina
Hypselonetes
Hypseloterorhynchus
Hypsiptycha
Hypsomyonia
Hysterohowellella
Hysterolites
Hystriculina

I

Iberirhynchia
Iberithyris
Idioglyptus
Idiorthis
Idiospira
Idiostrophia
Iheringithyris
Ikella
Iliella
Ilmarinia
Ilmenia
Ilmeniopsis
Ilmenispina
Ilmospirifer
Ilyinella
Imacanthyris
Imbrexia
Imbricatia
Imbricatospira
Imdentistella
Impiacus
Implexina
Inaequalis
Incisius
Incorthis
Independatrypa
Indigia
Indorhynchia
Indospirifer
Inflatia
Infurca
Ingria
Iniathyris
Iniproductus
Innaechia
Innuitella
Inopinatarcula
Insignitisinurostrum
Institella
Institifera
Institina
Inversella
Inversithyris
Invertina
Invertrypa
Iotina
Iowarhynchus
Iowatrypa
Ipherron
Irboskites
Irenothyris
Irgislella
Irhirea
Iridostrophia
Iru
Ishimia
Isjuminelina
Isjuminella
Ismenia
Isochonetes
Isocrania
Isogramma
Isophragma
Isopoma
Isorthis
Isospinatrypa
Isovella
Israelaria
Issedonia
Isumithyris
Ivanothyris
Ivanoviella
Ivdelinella
Ivdelinia
Ivshinella
Iwaispirifer

J

Jaanussonites
Jaffaia
Jaisalmeria
Jakutella
Jakutochonetes
Jakutoproductus
Jakutostrophia
Jamesella
Janiceps
Janiomya
Janius
Japanithyris
Jarovathyris
Jercia
Jevinellina
Jezercia
Jiangdaspirifer
Jielingia
Jiguliconcha
Jilinia
Jilinmartinia
Jilinospirifer
Jipuproductus
Jisuina
Jivinella
Jkella
Joania
Johnsonathyris
Johnsonetes
Johnsoniatrypa
Jolonica
Jolvia
Jonesea
Joviatrypa
Juralina
Juresania
Juvavella
Juvavellina

K

Kabanoviella
Kachathyris
Kadraliproductus
Kajnaria
Kakanuiella
Kalitvella
Kallirhynchia
Kamoica
Kampella
Kanakythyris
Kaninospirifer
Kansuella
Kaplex
Kaplicona
Karadagella
Karadagithyris
Karakulina
Karathele
Karavankina
Karbous
Karlicium
Karnotreta
Karpatiella
Karpinskia
Kasakhstania
Kasetia
Kassinella
Katastrophomena
Katunia
Kavesia
Kawhiarhynchia
Kayserella
Kayseria
Kedrpvpthyris
Kelamelia
Kelusia
Kendzhilgithyris
Kentronetes
Keokukia
Keratothyris
Kericserella
Kerpina
Keyserlingia
Keyserlingina
Khangaestrophia
Khasaghia
Khasagtina
Khinganospirifer
Khodalevichia
Kholbotchonia
Kiaeromena
Kiangsiella
Kikaithyris
Kimatothyris
Kindleina
Kinelina
Kingena
Kingenella
Kinghiria
Kinnella
Kintathyris
Kirkidium
Kirkina
Kisilia
Kitakamithyris
Kjaerina
Kjerulfina
Kleithriatreta
Klipsteinella
Klipsteinelloidea
Klukatrypa
Kochiproductus
Koeveskallina
Koigia
Kokomerena
Kolihium
Kolymithyris
Komiella
Komispirifer
Komukia
Koninckella
Koninckina
Koninckodonta
Konstantia
Korjakirhynchia
Kosirium
Kosoidea
Kotlaia
Kotujella
Kotujotreta
Kotylotreta
Kotysex
Kozhuchinella
Kozlenia
Kozlowskia
Kozlowskiellina
Kozlowskites
Kransia
Krattorthis
Kraussina
Krejcigrafella
Krimargyrotheca
Kritorhynchia
Krizistrophia
Krotovia
Kueichowella
Kullervo
Kulumbella
Kumbella
Kundatella
Kungaella
Kunlunia
Kurakithyris
Kurtomarginifera
Kurzgunia
Kutchirhynchia
Kutchithyris
Kutorgina
Kutorginella
Kuvelousia
Kvesanirhynchia
Kwangsia
Kwangsirhynchus
Kymatothyris
Kyrshabaktella
Kyrtatrypa

L

Labaia
Laballa
Labriproductus
Lacazella
Lachrymula
Lacunaerhynchia
Lacunarites
Lacunites
Lacunosella
Ladjia
Ladogia
Ladogiella
Ladogifornix
Ladogilina
Ladogilinella
Ladogiodes
Laevicyphomena
Laevigaterhynchia
Laevirhynchia
Laevispirifer
Laevithyris
Laevorhynchia
Laima
Laioporella
Lamanskya
Lambdarina
Lamcispinifera
Lamellaerhynchia
Lamelliconchidium
Lamellokoninckina
Lamellosathyris
Lamellosia
Laminatia
Lamnaespina
Lamnimargus
Lampangella
Lanceomyonia
Lanchangjiangia
Langella
Langkawai (?)
Langshanthyris
Lanipustula
Laosia
Lapasnia
Lapradella
Laqueus
Larispirifer
Larium
Lateralatirostrum
Laterispina
Lathamella
Laticrura
Latiflexa
Latiplecus
Latiproductus
Latirhynchia
Latispirifer
Latonotoechia
Lazella
Lazithyris
Lazutkinia
Leangella
Lebediorthis
Leiochonetes
Leiolepismatina
Leioproductus
Leiorhynchoidea
Leiorhynchoides
Leiorhynchus
Leioria
Leioseptathyris
Leiothyridina
Lenatoechia
Lenothyris
Lenzia
Leontiella
Lepidocrania
Lepidocycloides
Lepidocyclus
Lepidoleptaena
Lepidomena
Lepidorhynchia
Lepidorthis
Lepidospirifer
Lepismatina
Leptaena
Leptaenisca
Leptaenoidia
Leptaenomenclax
Leptaenopoma
Leptaenopyxis
Leptagonia
Leptalosia
Leptathyris
Leptella
Leptellina
Leptelloidea
Leptembolon
Leptestia
Leptestiina
Leptobolus
Leptocaryorhyncus
Leptochonetes
Leptocoelia
Leptocoelina
Leptodonta
Leptodontella
Leptodus
Leptoskelidion
Leptospira
Leptostrophia
Leptostrophiella
Leptothyrella
Leptothyrellopsis
Lercarella
Lethamia
Leurosina
Levenea
Levibiseptum
Leviconchidiella
Levigatella
Levipugnax
Levipustula
Levispira
Levitusia
Lialosia
Libyaeglossa
Libyaerhynchus
Licharewia
Lichnatrypa
Lievinella
Liljevallia
Limbatrypa
Limbella
Limbifera
Limbimurina
Limstrophina
Lindinella
Lindstroemella
Lingatrypa
Lingshanella
Linguithyris
Lingula
Lingulapholis
Lingularia
Lingulasma
Lingulella
Lingulellotreta
Lingulepis
Lingulipora
Lingulobolus
Lingulodiscina
Lingulops
Linguopugnoides
Linnarssonella
Linnarssonia
Linoporella
Linoproductus
Linoprotonia
Linostrophomena
Linterella
Linxiangxiella
Liocoelia
Lioleptaena
Liorhynchus
Liosotella
Liospiriferina (fossil per IRMNG)
Liostrophia
Liothyrella
Lipanteris
Liramia
Liraplecta
Liraria
Liraspirifer
Lirellaria
Lirellarina
Liricamera
Liriplica
Lissajousithyris
Lissatrypa
Lissatrypella
Lissatrypoidea
Lissella
Lissidium
Lissochonetes
Lissocoelina
Lissoleptaena
Lissomarginifera
Lissopleura
Lissorhynchia
Lissosia
Lissostrophia
Lissothyris
Lissotreta
Litocothia
Litothyris
Liveringia
Lixatrypa
Ljaschenkovia
Ljudmilispirifer
Llanoella
Loboidothyris
Loboidothyropsis
Loborina
Lobothyris
Lobothyroides
Lochkothele
Loczyella
Loenthyris
Loganella
Loilemia
Lokutella
Lomatiphora
Lomatorthis
Longdongshuia
Longispina
Longithyris
Longxianirhynchia
Lopasnia
Loperia
Lophrothyris
Lopingia
Lorangerella
Lordorthis
Loreleiella
Loriolithyris
Losvia
Lotharingella
Lowenstamia
Loxophragmus
Luanquella
Ludfordina
Luhaia
Luhotreta
Lunaria
Lunoglossa
Lunpolia
Luofuia
Lurgiticoma
Luterella
Lutetiarcula
Lychnothyris
Lycophoria
Lyonia
Lysidium
Lysigypa
Lyttonia

M

Maakina
Mabella
Macandrevia
Machaeraria
Machaerocolella
Machaerotoechia
Mackerrovia
Maclarenella
Macrocoelia
Macropleura
Macropotamorhynchus
Madarosia
Madoia
Maemia
Magadania
Magadina
Magadinella
Magas
Magasella
Magella
Magellania
Magharithyris
Magicostrophia
Magnicanalis
Magniplicatina
Magniventra
Magnumbonella
Majkopella
Makridinirhynchia
Malayanoplia
Malinella
Malleia
Malloproductus
Maltaia
Malurostrophia
Malwirhynchia
Mametothyris
Mamutinetes
Manespira
Manithyris
Mangkeluia
Manosia
Mansina
Maorielasma
Maorirhynchia
Maoristrophia
Mapingtichia
Marcharella
Margaritiproductus
Marginalosia
Marginatia
Marginicinctus
Marginifera
Marginirugus
Marginoproductus
Marginorthis
Marginovatia
Mariannaella
Marinurnula
Marionites
Maritimithyris
Markamia
Markitoechia
Marklandella
Martinia
Martiniella
Martiniopsis
Martinothyris
Matanoleptodus
Matutella
Mauispirifer
Maxillirhynchia
Mayaothyris
Maydenella
Mcewanella
Mclearnites
Mclearnitesella
Medessia
Mediospirifer
Mediterranirhynchia
Meekella
Megachonetes
Megaderbyia
Megakozlowskiella
Megalosia
Megamyonia
Meganterella
Meganteris
Megaplectatrypa
Megapleuronia
Megasalopina
Megaspinochonetes
Megasteges
Megastrophia
Megastropiella
Megathyris
Megatschernyschewia
Megerlia
Megerlina
Meglopterorhynchus
Megousia
Megumatrypa
Meifodia
Melvicalathis
Mendacella
Mendathyris
Mennespirifer
Mentzelia
Mentzelioides
Mentzeliopsis
Meonia
Merciella
Merista
Meristella
Meristelloides
Meristina
Meristorygma
Meristospira
Merophricus
Merospirifer
Mesocrania
Mesodouvillina
Mesoleptostrophia
Mesolissostrophia
Mesolobus
Mesonomia
Mesopholidostrophia
Mesoplica
Mesotreta
Metabolipa
Metacamarella
Metaplasia
Metathyrisina
Metorthis
Metriolepis
Mexicaria
Mezounia
Miaohuangrhynchus
Micella
Micidus
Mickwitzia
Micraphelia
Microcardinalia
Micromitra
Microrhynchia
Microsphaeridiorhynchus
Microtrypa
Mictospirifer
Millythyris
Mimaria
Mimella
Mimikonstantia
Mimorina
Minatrypa
Mingenewia
Miniprokopia
Minispina
Minithyris
Minororthis
Minutalirhynchia
Minutella (fossil per IRMNG)
Minutostropheodonta
Minysphenia
Minythyra
Miogryphus
Mirifusella
Mirilingula
Mirisquamea
Mirorthis
Misolia
Mistproductus
Mitchellella
Miyakothyris
Mjoesina
Moderatoproductus
Modestella
Moeschia
Mogoktella
Mogoliella
Moisseievia
Molongcola
Molongella
Molongia
Monadotoechia
Monelasmina
Mongoliella
Mongoliopsis
Mongolirhynchia
Mongolorhynx
Mongolosia
Mongolospira
Monobolina
Monoconvexa
Monomerella
Monorthis
Monsardithyris
Montanella
Monticlarella
Monticulifera
Montsenetes
Moorefieldella
Moorelina
Moorellina
Moquellina
Moraviaturia
Moravilla
Moravostrophia
Morganella
Morinorhynchus
Morphorhynchus
Morrisithyris
Mosquella
Moumina
Moutonithyris
Mucrospirifer
Mucrospiriferinella
Muirwoodella
Muirwoodia
Multicorhynchia
Multicostella
Multiridgia
Multispinula
Multispirifer
Munhella
Munieratrypa
Muriferella
Murihikurhynchia
Murinella
Murjukiana
Murravia
Musculina
Mutationella
Mycerosia
Mylloconotreta
Myodethyrium
Myopugnax
Myotreta
Myriospirifer
Myrmirhynx
Mystrophora

N

Nabarredia
Nabiaoia
Nadiastrophia
Nahoniella
Najadospirifer
Najdinothyris
Nakazatothyris
Nalivkinaria
Nalivkinia
Nalivkiniella  = Ala Nalivkin, 1979 (preoccupied)
Nanacalathis
Nanambonites
Nanatrypa
Nannirhynchia
Nanorthis
Nanospira
Nanothyris
Nantanella
Nanukidium
Naradanithyris
Narynella
Nasonirhynchia
Nastosia
Naukat
Navispira
Nayunnella
Neatrypa
Nebenothyris
Negramithyris
Neimongolella
Nekhoroshevia
Nekvasiloveia
Nekvasilovella
Nematocrania
Nemesa
Neoaemula (fossil per IRMNG)
Neoancistrocrania
Neobolus
Neobouchardia
Neochonetes
Neocirpa
Neocoelia
Neocramatia
Neocyrtina
Neodelthyris
Neofascicosta
Neoglobithyris
Neogypidula
Neokarpinskia
Neokjaerina
Neoliothyrina
Neometabolipa
Neopaulinella = Paulinella Boucot & Racheboeuf, 1987 (preoccupied)
Neophricadothyris
Neoplicatifera
Neoretzia
Neorhynchia
Neorhynchula
Neosandia = Sandia Sutherland & Harlow, 1973 (preoccupied)
Neoschizophoria
Neospirifer
Neospirigerina
Neostrophia
Neothecidella
Neothyris
Neotreta
Neowellerella
Neoyanguania
Nepasitoechia
Nereidella
Nerthebrochus
Nervostrophia
Neumanella
Neumania
Neumayrithyris
Newberria
Nicolella
Nicoloidea
Nicolorthis
Nigerinoplica
Nikiforovaena
Nikolaevirhynchus
Ningbingella
Ninglongothyris
Niorhynx
Nipponirhynchia
Nipponithyris
Nisusia
Niutoushania
Niviconia
Nix
Nochoroiella
Nocturneilla
Nodaea
Nodella
Noetlingia
Nordathyris
Nordella
Nordispirifer
Nordotoechia
Norella
Notanoplia
Nothokuvelousia
Nothopindax
Nothorthis
Notiobolus
Notiochonetes
Notoconchidium
Notoleptaena
Notolosia
Notoparmella
Notorthisina
Notosaria
Notoscaphidia
Notosia
Notospirifer
Notostrophia
Notothyrina
Notothyris
Notozyga
Novellinetes
Novocrania
Novozemelia
Nubialba
Nucleata
Nucleatina
Nucleatula
Nucleorhynchia
Nucleospira
Nucleusorhynchia
Nudauris
Nudirostralina
Nudispiriferina
Nudymia
Nugnecella
Nuguschella
Numericoma
Nurataella
Nuria
Nurochonetes
Nushbiella
Nyalamurhynchia
Nyege
Nymphorhynchia

O

Oanduporella
Obesaria
Oblongarcula
Obnixia
Obolella
Obolopsis
Obolorugia
Obolus
Obovothyris
Obsoletirhynchia
Obturamentella
Oceanithyris
Ochotathyris
Ochotorhynchia
Ocnerorthis
Ocorthis
Odarovithyris
Odontospirifer
Odoratus
Oehlertella
Oepikina
Oepikinella
Oepikites
Ogbinia
Ogilviella
Oglu
Oglupes
Ogmoplecia
Ogmusia
Oina
Oiosia
Okathyris
Oldhamina
Oldhaminella
Oleneothyris
Olentotreta
Oleorthis
Olgerdia
Oligomys
Oligoptycherhynchus
Oligorachis
Oligorhynchia
Oligorhytisia
Oligorthis
Oligothyrina
Ombonia
Omnutakhella
Omolonella
Omolonia
Omolonorhynchia
Omolonothyris
Onavia
Oncosarina
Onniella
Onnizetina
Onopordumaria
Onugorhynchia
Onychoplecia
Onychotreta
Opikella
Opisconidion
Opisthotreta
Opsiconidion
Orbicoelia
Orbiculatisiurostrum
Orbiculoidea
Orbiculopora
Orbiculothyris
Orbinaria
Orbirhynchia
Orbithele
Orenburgella
Oriensellina
Orientospira
Orientospirifer
Orientothyris
Origostrophia
Oriskania
Orlovirhynchia
Ornatothyrella
Ornatothyris
Ornithella
Ornithothyris
Ornothyrella
Orthambonites
Orthidiella
Orthidium
Orthiella
Orthis
Orthisocrania
Orthocarina
Ortholina
Orthopleura
Orthorhynchuloides
Orthorhyncula
Orthospirifer
Orthostrophella
Orthostrophia
Orthotetella
Orthotetes
Orthotetoides
Orthothetina
Orthothrix
Orthothyris
Orthotichia
Orthotoma
Orthotropia
Orulgania
Orusia
Oslogonites
Osmarella
Ospreyella
Otariella
Otarorhynchia
Otospirifer
Ottadalenites
Otusia
Ovalospira
Ovatathyris
Ovatia
Overtonia
Overtoniina
Ovidiella
Ovlatchania
Owenirhynchia
Oxlosia
Oxoplecia
Oxycolpella
Oxypleurorhynchia
Ozora

P

Pachancorhynchia
Pachyglossella
Pachymagas
Pachyplax
Pachythyris
Pacificocoelia
Pacymoorellina
Paeckelmanella
Pahlenella
Pajaudina (fossil per IRMNG)
Palaeobolus
Palaeochoristites
Palaeoglossa
Palaeoldhamina
Palaeoleptostrophia
Palaeoschizophoria
Palaeoschmidtites
Palaeospirifer
Palaeostrophomena
Palaeotrimerella
Paldiskites
Paleolibys = Libys Massa, Termier & Termier, 1974 (preoccupied)
Paleopetria = Petria Mendes, 1957 (preoccupied)
Paleostrophia
Palmerhytis
Pamirorhynchia
Pamirotheca
Pamirothyris
Pamirothyropsis
Pammegetherhynchus
Pampoecilorhynchus
Panderina
Pantellaria
Papiliolinus
Papillostrophia
Papodina
Paraacanthothyris
Parabifolium
Paraboubeithyris
Parabuxtonia
Paracapillithyris
Parachonetella
Parachonetes
Parachoristites
Paracomposita
Paracostanoplia
Paracraniops
Paracrothyris
Paracrurithyris
Parademonedys
Paraderbyia
Paradinobolus
Paradolerorthis
Paradoxothyris
Paradygella
Paraemanuella
Parageyerella
Paraglossinulus
Parahemiptychina
Parajuresania
Parakansuella
Parakarpinskia
Parakinetica
Parakingena
Paralaballa
Paralazutkinia
Paraldingia
Paralenorthis
Paralepismatina
Paraleptodus
Paraleptostrophia
Parallelelasma
Parallelora
Paralyttonia
Paramarginatia
Paramarginifera
Parameekella
Paramentzelia
Paramerista
Paramesolobus
Paramonticulifera
Paramuirwoodia
Paranaia
Paranisopleurella
Paranorella
Paranorellina
Parantiptychia
Paranudirostralina
Paraoligorhyncha
Paraonychoplecia
Paraorthotetina
Parapholidostrophia
Paraphorhynchus
Paraplatythyris
Paraplicanoplia
Paraplicatifera
Parapugnax
Parapulchratia
Paraquadrithyris
Parareticularia
Pararhactorhynchia
Pararhipidium
Pararhynchospirina
Parasphenarina
Paraspirifer
Paraspiriferina
Parastringocephalus
Parastrophina
Parastrophinella
Parastrophonella
Parasulcatinella
Paratetratomia
Parathecidea
Parathyridina
Parathyrisina
Paratreta
Paratribonium
Parazyga
Parenteletes
Parmephrix
Parmorthina
Parmorthis
Parmula
Paromalomena
Paromoeopygma
Parthirhynchia
Parunicinella
Parvaltissimarostrum
Parvirhynchia
Paryphella
Paryphorhynchopora
Patagorhynchia
Paterina
Paterorthis
Paterula
Patriaspirifer
Paucicostella
Paucicrura
Paucispinauria
Paucispinifera
Paucistrophia
Paulonia
Paurogastroderhynchus
Paurorhyncha
Paurorthina
Paurorthis
Payuella
Pectenoproductus
Pectorhyncha
Peculneithyris
Peetzatrypa
Pegmarhynchia
Pegmathyris
Pegmatreta
Pelagodiscus
Peleicostella
Pelmanella
Pelonomia
Peltichia
Pemphixina
Pembrostrophia (fossil per IRMNG)
Peniculauris
Pennospiriferina
Pentactinella
Pentagonia
Pentamerella
Pentamerifera
Pentameroides
Pentamerus
Pentithyris
Pentlandella
Pentlandina
Penzhinella
Penzhinothyris
Perakia
Peratos
Perditocardinia
Peregrinella
Peregrinellina
Peregrinelloidea
Periallus
Perichonetes
Peridalejina
Perigeyerella
Perimecocoelia
Perissothyris
Peristerothyris
Peritrimerella
Peritritoechia
Permasyrinx
Permianella
Permicola
Permochonetes
Permophricodothyris
Permorthotestes
Permospirifer
Permundaria
Perrarisinurostrum
Perrierithyris
Perryspirifer
Peshiatrypa
Pesterevatrypa
Petalochonetes
Petalothyris
Petasmaia
Petasmaria
Petasmatherus
Petrocrania
Petroria
Petshorospirifer
Pexidella
Phaceloorthis
Phaneropora
Phapsirhynchia
Pharcidodiscus
Phenacozugmayerella
Philhedra
Philhedrella
Philippotia
Phlogoiderhynchus
Phoenicitoechia
Pholidostrophia
Phragmophora
Phragmorthis
Phragmostrophia
Phragmothyris
Phrenophoria
Phricodothyris
Phyllonia
Phymatothyris
Physemella
Physetorhynchia
Physotreta
Piarorhynchella
Piarorhynchia
Picnotreta
Pictothyris
Pilkena
Piloricilla
Pinaxiothyris
Pinegathyris
Pinghuangella
Pinguaella
Pinguispirifer
Pionodema
Pionomena
Pionopleurum
Pionorthis
Pionothyris
Pirgulia
Pirithyris
Pirothyris
Pirotella
Pirotothyris
Pisirhynchia
Placothyris
Placotriplesia
Plaesiomys
Plagiorhyncha
Planalvus
Planatrypa
Plancella
Planicardina
Planihaydenella
Planirhynchia
Planispina
Planodouvillina
Planoharknessella
Planoproductus
Planothyris
Planovatirostrum
Platidia
Platycancrinella
Platyconcha
Platyglossariorhynchus
Platymena
Platyorthis
Platyrachella
Platyselma
Platyspirifer
Platystrophia
Platyterorhynchus
Platythyris
Platytoechia
Plebejochonetes
Plectambonites
Plectatrypa
Plectelasma
Plectella
Plectocamara
Plectoconcha
Plectodonta
Plectodontella
Plectoglossa
Plectoidothyris
Plectorhynchella
Plectorthis
Plectospira
Plectosyntrophia
Plectothyrella
Plectothyris
Plectotreta
Plectotrophia
Pleiopleurina
Plekonella
Plekonina
Plesicarinatina
Plesiothyris
Plethorhyncha
Pleuraloma
Pleurelasma
Pleurochonetes
Pleurocornu
Pleurodium
Pleuropugnoides
Pleurorthis
Pleurothyrella
Plicaea
Plicanoplia
Plicanoplites
Plicarostrum
Plicatifera
Plicatiferina
Plicatocyrtia
Plicatoderbya
Plicatolingula
Plicatoria
Plicatospiriferella
Plicatosyrinx
Plicidium
Plicirhynchia
Plicochonetes
Plicocoelina
Plicocyrtia
Plicocyrtina
Plicodevonaria
Plicogypa
Plicoplasia
Plicoproductus
Plicostricklandia
Plicostropheodonta
Plicotorynifer
Plionoptycherhynchus
Pliothyrina
Ploughsharella
Podolella
Podtscheremia
Poikilosakos
Poloniproductus
Polylasma
Polymorpharia
Polytoechia
Pomatospirella
Pomatotrema
Pomeraniotreta
Pomeromena
Pompeckium
Pompoecilorhynchus
Pondospirifer
Pontalorhynchia
Pontielasma
Pontisia
Porambonites
Porambonitoides
Poramborthis
Porostictia
Portneufia
Portranella
Posicomta
Postepithyris
Pradochonetes
Pradoia
Praeangustothyris
Praeargyrotheca
Praecubanothyris
Praecyclothyris
Praegibbithyris
Praegnamtenia
Praegoniothyris
Praehorridonia
Praelacazella
Praelacunosella
Praelongithyris
Praemonticlarella
Praeneothyris
Praeudesia
Praewaagenoconcha
Prantlina
Prelissorhynchia
Primipilaria
Primorewia
Prionorhynchia
Prionothyris
Proanadyrella
Proatribonium
Probolarina
Probolionia
Proboscidella
Proboscidina
Proboscisambon
Procarinatina
Procerulina
Prochlidonophora
Prochoristitella
Proconchidium
Prodavidsonia
Productella
Productellana
Productellina
Productelloides
Productina
Productorthis
Productus
Progonambonites
Prokopia
Prolazutkina
Promarginifera
Properotundirostrum
Propriopugnus
Propygope
Prorensselaeria
Proreticularia
Prorichtofenia
Prorugaria
Proschizophoria
Prosoponella
Prospira
Prosserella
Prostricklandia
Protambonites
Protanidanthus
Protathyris
Protatrypa
Proteguliferina
Protegulorhynchia
Proteorhynchia
Proteorthis
Protobolus
Protochonetes
Protocortezorthis
Protocymostrophia
Protodouvillina
Protogamginifera
Protogusarella
Protohesperonomia
Protoleptostrophia
Protomegastrophia
Protomendacella
Protoniella
Protophragmapora
Protoreticularia
Protorhyncha
Protorthis
Protoshaleria
Protoskenidiodes
Prototeguliferina
Prototegulithyris
Prototreta
Protozeuga
Protozyga
Psamathopalass
Psebajithyris
Pseudatrypa
Pseudoanisopleurella
Pseudoantoquatonia
Pseudoaulacothyris
Pseudoavonia
Pseudobolus
Pseudobornhardtina
Pseudocamaratoechia
Pseudocamarophoria
Pseudochonetes
Pseudoconchidium
Pseudocrania
Pseudocyrtina
Pseudoderbyia
Pseudodicellomus
Pseudodicoelosia
Pseudodielasma
Pseudodouvillina
Pseudogibbirhynchia
Pseudoglossirotoechia
Pseudoglossothyris
Pseudogruenewalldtia
Pseudohalorella
Pseudoharttina
Pseudohomeospira
Pseudokingena
Pseudokymatothyris
Pseudolabaia
Pseudolaballa
Pseudolepismatina
Pseudoleptellina
Pseudoleptodus
Pseudolingula
Pseudomarginifera
Pseudomendacella
Pseudomeristina
Pseudometoptoma
Pseudomimella
Pseudomonticlarella
Pseudomonticulifera
Pseudonudirostra
Pseudoparazyga
Pseudopentagonia
Pseudopholidops
Pseudoporambonites
Pseudoprotathyris
Pseudopugnax
Pseudopygoides
Pseudorhaetina
Pseudorostranteris
Pseudorugitela
Pseudosieberella
Pseudosinotectirostrum
Pseudospiriferina
Pseudospondylospira
Pseudostrophalosia
Pseudostrophochonetes
Pseudostrophomena
Pseudosyringothyris
Pseudosyrinx
Pseudotybithyris
Pseudouncinulus
Pseudoundispirifer
Pseudowattonithyris
Pseudowellerella
Pseudoyunnanella
Psilocamara
Psilocamerella
Psiloria
Psilothyris
Psioidea
Psioidiella
Pteroplecta
Pterospirifer
Pterostrophia
Ptilorhynchia
Ptilotorhynchus
Ptychoglyptus
Ptychomaletoechia
Ptychopeltis
Ptychopleurella
Ptyctorhynchia
Ptyctothyris
Ptygmactrum
Puanatrypa
Puanospirifer
Pugilis
Pugnaria
Pugnax
Pugnoides
Pulchratia
Pulsia
Punctatrypa
Punctocyrtella
Punctolira
Punctospirella
Punctospirifer
Punctothyris
Punctspinatrypa
Purdonella
Pusillagutta
Pustula
Pustulatia
Pustuloplica
Pustulospiriferina
Pycnobrochus
Pycnoria
Pygites
Pygmaella
Pygmochonetes
Pygope
Pyraeneica
Pyramidathyris
Pyramina

Q
 

Qianjiangella
Qianomena
Qiansispirifer
Qilianoconcha
Qilianotryma
Qilianotrypa
Qinghaispiriferina
Qinglongia
Qingthyris
Qingyenia
Qinlingia
Qinlingotoechia
Qispiriferina
Quadratia
Quadratirhynchia
Quadrifarius
Quadrisonia
Quadrithyrina
Quadrithyris
Quadrochonetes
Quangyuania
Quasiavonia
Quasidavidsonia
Quasimartina
Quasistrophonella
Quasithambonia
Quebecia
Quinlingia
Quinquenella
Quiriagites
Quizhouspirifer
Quondogia

R

Rackirhynchia
Radiatrypa
Radimatrypa
Radiomena
Rafanoglossa
Rafinesquina
Rahouiarhynchia
Railtonella
Ralia
Rallacosta
Ramavectus
Ramovsina
Ranorthis
Raridium
Rariella
Rastelligera
Ratburia
Raunites
Ravozetina
Rawdonia
Rectambitus
Rectigypidida
Rectirhynchia
Rectithyris
Rectotrophia
Redlichella
Reedoconcha
Reeftonella
Reeftonia
Reflexia
Reinversella
Remnevitoechia
Renaudia
Rensselaeria
Rensselaerina
Rensselandia
Rensselandioidea
Replcoskenidioides
Resserella
Retaria
Retichonetes
Reticularia
Reticulariina
Reticulariopsis
Reticulatia
Reticulatochonetes
Reticulatrypa
Retimarginifera
Retroplexus
Retrorsirostra
Retzia
Retziella
Retzispirifer
Reuschella
Reversella
Rhactomena
Rhactorhynchia
Rhactorthis
Rhaetina
Rhaetinopsis
Rhamnaria
Rhapidothyris
Rhenorensselaria
Rhenostrophia
Rhenothyris
Rhinotreta
Rhipidium
Rhipidomella
Rhipidomelloides
Rhipidomena
Rhipidothyris
Rhizothyris
Rhombaria
Rhomboidella
Rhombothyris
Rhondellina
Rhynchoferella
Rhynchonella
Rhynchonellina
Rhynchonelloidea
Rhynchonelloidella
Rhynchonellopsis
Rhynchopora
Rhynchorina
Rhynchorthis
Rhynchospirifer
Rhynchospirina
Rhynchotetra
Rhynchotetraoides
Rhynchotrema
Rhynchotreta
Rhynchotretina
Rhyncora
Rhynobolus
Rhynoleichus
Rhyselasma
Rhysostrophia
Rhysotreta
Rhyssochonetes
Rhytialosia
Rhytiophora
Rhytirhynchia
Rhytisia
Rhytisoria
Rhytistrophia
Richthofenia
Rictia
Rigauxia
Rigbyella
Rimirhynchia
Rimirhynchopsis
Riograndella
Rionorhynchia
Riorhynchia
Rioultina
Ripidiorhynchus
Robertorthis
Robinsonella
Robustirhynchia
Rochatorhynchia
Rocheithyris
Rochtex
Roemerella
Romingerina
Rorespirifer
Rosella
Rosobolus
Rossirhynchus
Rossithyris
Rostranteris
Rostricellula
Rostrirhynchia
Rostrospirifer
Rotaia
Rotundostrophia
Rouillieria
Rowellella
Rowleyella
Rozmanaria
Rudirhynchia
Ruegenella
Rufispirifer
Rugaltarostrum
Rugaria
Rugatia
Rugauris
Rugia
Rugicostella
Rugitela
Rugithyris
Rugivestis
Rugoclostus
Rugoconcha
Rugodavidsonia
Rugoleptaena
Rugolepyros
Rugosatrypa
Rugosochonetes
Rugosomarginifera
Rugosothyris
Rugosowerbyella
Rugostrophia
Rurambonites
Russiella
Russirhynchia
Rustella
Ruthiphiala
Rutorhynchia
Rutrumella
Ryocarhynchus
Rzonsnickiana

S

Saccogonum
Saccorhynchia
Sacothyris
Sacothyropsis
Saesorthis
Saetosina
Sagueresia
Saharonetes
Sajakella
Sakawairhynchia
Salacorthis
Salairella
Salairina
Salairotoechia
Salanygolina
Salgirella
Salonia
Salopia
Salopina
Salopinella
Sampo
Sandrella
Sangiaothyris
Sanjuanella
Sanjuanetes
Sanjuania
Sanxiaella
Sardope
Sardorhynchia
Sarganostega
Sartenaerus = Centrorhynchus Sartenaer, 1970 (preoccupied)
Sarytchevinella
Satpakella
Saucrobrochus
Saucrorthis
Saukrodictya
Savageina
Scacchinella
Scalpellirhynchia
Scambocris
Scamnomena
Scapharina
Scaphelasma
Scaphiocoelia
Scaphorthis
Sceletonia
Scenesia
Schachriomonia
Schalidomorthis
Schedophyla
Schegultania
Schellwienella
Schistochonetes
Schizambon
Schizobolus
Schizocrania
Schizonema
Schizopholis
Schizophorella
Schizophoria
Schizoramma
Schizoria
Schizospirifer
Schizostrophina
Schizotreta
Schizotretoides
Schmidtites
Schnurella
Schrenkiella
Schuchertella
Schuchertellopsis
Schuchertina
Schwagerispira
Scissicosta
Scoloconcha
Sculptospirifer
Scumulus
Scutepustula
Securina
Securithyris
Sedenticellula
Selenella
Selennjachia
Sellithyris
Selloproductus
Semenewia
Semibrachythyrina
Semicostella
Semileptagonia
Semilingula
Seminucella
Seminula
Semiotoechia
Semiplanella
Semiplanus
Semiproductus
Semitreta
Sendaithyris
Senokosica
Sentolunia
Sentosia
Sentosoioides
Septacamera
Septachonetes
Septalaria
Septalariopsis
Septaliphoria
Septaliphorioidea
Septamphiclina
Septapermella
Septarinia
Septasteges
Septathyris
Septatoechia
Septatrypa
Septemirostellum
Septicollarina
Septiconcha
Septirhynchia
Septocamarella
Septocrurella
Septocyclothyris
Septoparmella
Septorthis
Septospirifer
Septospirigirella
Septosyringothyris
Septothyris
Septulirhynchia
Seratrypa
Serbarinia
Serbiarhynchia
Serbiothyris
Sergospirifer
Sergunkovia
Sericoidea
Serratocrista
Serrulatrypa
Seseloisi
Sestropoma
Setigerites
Settedabania
Severella
Severginella
Shagamella
Shaleria
Shaleriella
Sharpirhynchia
Shimodaia
Shiquianella
Shiragia
Shishapangmaella
Shlyginia
Shordolella
Shoshonorthis
Shouxianella
Shrockia
Shumardella
Siberiothyris
Siberistrophia
Sibiratrypa
Sibiria
Sibirispira
Sibiritoechia
Sicelia
Sichuanrhynchis
Sicorhyncha
Sicularia
Sieberella
Sigmelasma
Sigopallus
Sikasella
Silesiathyris
Simplicarina
Simpliciforma
Simplicithyris
Sinochonetes
Sinoglossa
Sinoproductella
Sinorhynchia
Sinorthis
Sinoshaleria
Sinostrophia
Sinotectirostrum
Sinotrimerella
Sinuatella
Sinucosta
Sinucostella
Sinuplicorhynchia
Sinusella
Siphonobolus
Siphonosia
Siphonotreta
Sivorthis
Skelidorygma
Skenidioides
Skenidium
Slavinithyris
Slovenirhynchia
Smeathenella
Smirnovaena
Smirnovina
Snezhnorhynchia
Socraticum
Sogxianthyris
Sokolskya
Solidipontirostrum
Solitudinella
Somalirhynchia
Somalitela
Somalithyris
Sommeriella
Sonculina
Songzichonetes
Soudleyella
Sowerbina
Sowerbyella
Sowerbyites
Spanodonta
Spasskothyris
Sphaerathyris
Sphaerirhynchia
Sphaeroidothyris
Sphenalosia
Sphenarina
Sphenophragmus
Sphenorhynchia
Sphenorthis
Sphenospira
Sphenosteges
Sphenotreta
Sphriganaria
Spinarella
Spinatrypa
Spinatrypina
Spinauris
Spinella
Spinifrons
Spinilingula
Spinispirifer
Spinocarinifera
Spinochonetes
Spinocyrtia
Spinolepismatina
Spinolyttonia
Spinomarginifera
Spinomartinia
Spinoplasia
Spinopunctatrypa
Spinorthis
Spinorugifera
Spinospirifer
Spinostrophia
Spinulicosta
Spinuliplica
Spinulothele
Spinulothyris
Spirelytha
Spirifer
Spiriferella
Spiriferellina
Spiriferelloides
Spiriferina
Spiriferinaella
Spiriferinoides
Spirigerella
Spirigerellina
Spirigerina
Spirinella
Spirisosium
Spiropunctifera
Spitzbergenia
Spondyglossella
Spondylobolus
Spondylopyxis
Spondylospira
Spondylostrophia
Spondylothyris
Spondylotreta
Spuriosa
Spurispirifer
Spyridiophora
Squamaria
Squamathyris
Squamatina
Squamilingulella
Squamiplana
Squamirhynchia
Squamularia
Squamulariina
Stainbrookia
Stauromata
Stegacanthia
Stegerhynchops
Stegerhynchus
Stegocornu
Stegorhynchella
Steinhagella
Stelckia
Stenaulacorhynchus
Stenocamara
Stenoglossariorhynchus
Stenogmus
Stenometoporhynchus
Stenopentamerus
Stenorhynchia
Stenorina
Stenosarina
Stenoscisma
Stepanoconchus
Stepanoviella
Stepanoviina
Stereochia
Stethothyris
Stichotrophia
Stictozoster
Stilpnotreta
Stiphrothyris
Stipulina
Stolmorhynchia
Stolzenburgiella
Straelenia
Streptaria
Streptis
Streptopomum
Streptorhynchus
Striarina
Striatifera
Striatochonetes
Striatoproductella
Striatopugnax
Striatorhynchus
Striatospica
Stricklandia
Stricklandiella
Stricklandistrophia
Strictozoster
Strigirhynchia
Strigospina
Striirhynchia
Striirichthofenia
Striispirifer
Striithyris
Stringocephalus
Stringodiscus
Stringomimus
Striochonetes
Strixella
Strongylobrochus
Strongyloria
Strophalosia
Strophalosiella
Strophalosiina
Strophochonetes
Strophodonta
Strophomena
Strophonella
Strophonellites
Strophonelloides
Strophopleura
Strophoprion
Strophoproductus
Strophorichthofenia
Stroudithyris
Struveina
Struvethyris
Sturtella
Subansiria
Subcuspidella
Subglobosochonetes
Subrensselandia
Subriana
Subsinucephalus
Subspirifer
Substriatifera
Subtaeniothaerus
Subtransmena
Suessia
Sufetirhyncha
Suiaella
Sulcataria
Sulcathyris
Sulcatina
Sulcatinella
Sulcatorthis
Sulcatospira
Sulcatospirifer
Sulcatostrophia
Sulcatothyris
Sulcicosta
Sulcicostula
Sulciphoria
Sulciplica
Sulciplicatatrypa
Sulcirhynchia
Sulcirostra
Sulcirugaria
Sulcispiriferina
Sulcorhynchia
Sulcupentamerus
Sulevorthis
Supertrilobus
Surindia
Surugathyris
Svalbardia
Svalbardoproductus
Svaljavithyris
Svetlania
Svobodaina
Swaicoelia
Swantonia
Symmatrypa
Symphythyris
Synatrypa
Syndielasma
Syntomaria
Syntrophia
Syntrophina
Syntrophinella
Syntrophioides
Syntrophodonta
Syntrophopsis
Sypharatrypa
Syringospira
Syringothyris
Systenothyris

T

Tabarhynchus
Tabellina
Tacinia
Tadschikia
Taemostrophia
Taeniothaerus
Taffia
Tafilaltia
Taimyrella
Taimyropsis
Taimyrothyris
Taimyrrhynx
Tainotoechia
Tainuirhynchia
Talasoproductus
Talentella
Taleoleptaena
Talovkorhynchia
Tamarella
Tanakura
Tanerhynchia
Tanggularella
Tangshanella
Tangxiangia
Tannuspirifer
Tanyoscapha
Tanyothyris
Taoqupospira
Tapajotia
Taphrodonta
Taphrorthis
Taphrosestria
Tarandrospirifer
Tarfaya
Tarutiglossa
Tashanomena
Tasmalella
Tastaria
Tatjamoa
Tatjania
Thaumatosia
Tauromenia
Taurothyris
Tautosia
Tazzarinia
Tchadania
Tcharella
Tchegemithyris
Tcherskidium
Tecnocyrtina
Tectarea
Tectatrypa
Tegulella
Teguliferina
Tegulithyris
Tegulocrea
Tegulorhynchia
Teichertina
Teichostrophia
Telaeoshaleria
Teleoproductus
Telothyris
Tenellodermis
Tenisia
Tenticospirifer
Tenuiatrypa
Tenuichonetes
Tenuicostella
Tenuisinurostrum
Teratelasma
Teratelasmella
Terebratalia
Terebrataliopsis
Terebratella
Terebratula
Terebratulina
Terebratuloidea
Terebrirostra
Terrakea
Tesuquea
Tethyrhynchia
Tetjuchithyris
Tetracamera
Tetractinella
Tetragonetes
Tetraloba
Tetralobula
Tetraodontella
Tetraphalerella
Tetrarhynchia
Tetratomia
Texarina
Texathyris
Thaerodonta
Thamnosia
Thaumatrophia
Thebesia
Thecidea
Thecidella
Thecidellina
Thecidiopsis
Thecocyrtella
Thecocyrtelloidea
Thecospira
Thecospirella
Thecospiropsis
Thedusia
Theodossia
Thiemella
Thliborhynchia
Thomasaria
Thomasella
Thuleproductus
Thurmannella
Thyratryaria
Thysanobolus
Thysanotos
Tiaretithyris
Tibetatrypa
Tibetothyris
Tichirhynchus
Tichosina
Tilasia
Timalina
Timaniella
Timanospirifer
Timorhynchia
Timorina
Tingella
Tipispirifer
Tiramnia
Tismanorthis
Tissintia
Titanambonites
Titanaria
Titanomena
Titanothyris
Tityrophoria
Tivertonia
Tobejalotreta
Togaella
Togatrypa
Tolmatchoffia
Tomasina
Tomestenoporhynchus
Tomilia
Tomiopsis
Tomiproductus
Tonasirhynchia
Tongzithyris
Tonsella
Toquimaella
Toquimia
Tornquistia
Torquirhynchia
Torynechus
Torynelasma
Torynifer
Toryniferella
Tosuhuthyris
Totia
Tourmakeadia
Toxonelasma
Toxorthis
Transennatia
Transversaria
Trasgu
Trautscholdia
Treioria
Trematis
Trematobolus
Trematorthis
Trematosia
Trematospira
Treptotreta
Tretorhynchia
Triadispira
Triadithyris
Triangope
Triasorhynchia
Triathyris
Trichochonetes
Trichorhynchia
Trichothyris
Tricoria
Tridensilis
Trifidarcula
Trifidorostellum
Trigonatrypa
Trigonellina
Trigonirhynchella
Trigonirhynchia
Trigonirhynchioides
Trigonithyris
Trigonoglossa
Trigonosemus
Trigonospirifer
Trigonotreta
Trigonotrophia
Trigrammaria
Trilobostrophia
Trimerella
Trimurellina
Triplesia
Triseptata
Triseptothyris
Tritoechia
Trochalocyrtina
Trochifera
Trondorthis
Tropeothyris
Trophisina
Tropidelasma
Tropidoglossa
Tropidoleptus
Tropidothyris
Trotlandella
Trucizetina
Truncalosia
Truncatenia
Tschatkalia
Tschernyschewia
Tscherskidium
Tshemsarythyris
Tubaria
Tubegatanella
Tuberella
Tubersulculatella
Tubersulculus
Tubithyris
Tubulostrophia
Tudiaophomena
Tulathyris
Tulcumbella
Tulipina
Tuloja
Tulungospirifer
Tumarinia
Tunethyris
Tungussotoechia
Tunisiglossa
Tuotalania
Turarella
Turganiella
Turgenostrophia
Turkmenithyris
Turriculum
Tuvaechonetes
Tuvaella
Tuvaerhynchus
Tuvaestrophia
Tuvinia
Twenhofelia
Tyersella
Tylambonites
Tyloplecta
Tylospiriferina
Tylothyris
Tyrganiella
Tyronella
Tyryrhynchus

U

Uchtella
Uchtospirifer
Uexothyris
Ufonicoelia
Ujandinella
Ujukites
Ukoa
Ulbospirifer
Uldziathyris
Umboanctus
Uncinella
Uncinulus
Uncinunellina
Uncisteges
Uncites
Uncitispira
Undaria
Undatrypa
Undelella
Undellaria
Undiferina
Undispirifer
Undispiriferoides
Undithyrella
Undulella
Undulorhyncha
Uniplicatorhynchia
Unispirifer
Uralella
Uraloconchus
Uraloproductus
Uralorhynchia
Uralospira
Uralospirifer
Uralotoechia
Urbanirhynchia
Urella
Urushtenia
Urushtenoidea
Ushkolia
Ussunia
Ussuricamara
Ussurichonetes
Ussurirhynchia

V

Vaculina
Vadimia
Vadum
Vaga Sapel'nikov & Rukavishnikova, 1973 jr. homonym of Vaga Zimmerman, 1958, a butterfly.
Vagranella
Vagrania
Valcourea
Valdaria
Valdiviathyris
Vallomyonia
Vandalotreta
Vandercammenina
Vandobiella
Vaniella
Variatrypa
Vectella
Vediproductus
Veerersalosia
Veghirhynchia
Veliseptum
Vellamo
Velostrophia
Venezuelia
Verchojania
Verkhotomia
Vermiculothecidea
Verneuilia
Vex
Viallithyris
Viarhynchia
Victorithyris
Viligella
Viligothyris
Villicundella
Vincentirhynchia
Viodostrophia
Virbium
Virgiana
Virgianella
Virginiata
Virgoria
Visbyella
Vitiliproductus
Vitimetula
Vladimirella
Vladimirirhynchus
Voiseyella
Volborthia
Volgathyris
Volirhynchia
Voskopitoechia
Vosmiverstum

W

Waagenites
Waagenoconcha
Waconella
Wadiglossa
Waikatorhynchia
Waiparia
Wairakiella
Wairakirhynchia
Waisiuthyrina
Walcottina
Walkerithyris
Waltonia
Wangyuia
Wardakia
Warrenella
Warrenellina
Warsawia
Waterhouseiella
Wattonithyris
Webbyspira
Weberithyris
Weibeia
Weiningia
Weizhouella
Weldonithyris
Wellerella
Wenxianirhynchus
Werneckeella
Werriea
Westbroekina
Westonia
Westonisca
Westralicrania
Whidbornella
Whitfieldella
Whitspakia
Whittardia
Wilberrya
Wilsoniella
Wimanella
Wimanoconcha
Wiradjuriella
Wittenburgella
Worobievella
Wulongella
Wulungguia
Wutubulakia
Wyatkina
Wyella
Wyndhamia
Wynnia
Wysogorskiella

X

Xanastur
Xanthea
Xenambonites
Xenelasma
Xenelasmella
Xenelasmopsis
Xeniopugnax
Xenizostrophia
Xenobrochus
Xenocryptonella
Xenomartinia
Xenorina
Xenorthis
Xenosaria
Xenosteges
Xenostina
Xenostrophia
Xenothyris
Xerospirifer
Xerxespirifer
Xestosia
Xestosina
Xestotrema
Xiangzhounia
Xiaobangdaia
Xinanorthis
Xinanospirifer
Xinjiangiproductus
Xinjiangospirifer
Xinjiangthyris
Xinshaoella
Xinshaoproductus
Xizangostrophia
Xysila
Xystostrophia

Y

Yabeithyris
Yagonia
Yakovlevia
Yakutijaella
Yalongia
Yanbianella
Yanetechia
Yangkongia
Yangtzeella
Yanguania
Yanishewskiella
Yanospira
Yaonoiella
Yarirhynchia
Yekerpene
Yeosinella
Yeothyris
Ygerodiscus
Yichangorthis
Yidunella
Yidurella
Yingwuspirifer
Yochelsonia
Yongjia
Yorkia
Ypsilorhynchus
Yuanbaella
Yuezhuella
Yukiangites
Yulongella
Yunnanella
Yunnanoleptaena
Yunshanella

Z

Zaissania
Zanclorhyncha
Zdimir
Zdimirella
Zeilleria
Zeillerina
Zellania
Zeravshania
Zeravshanotoechia
Zeugopleura
Zeuschneria
Zhantella
Zhejiangella
Zhejiangorthis
Zhejiangospirifer
Zhenania
Zhexichonetes
Zhidothyris
Zhonghuacoelia
Zhongpingia
Zia
Ziganella
Zilimia
Zittelina
Zlichopyramis
Zlichorhynchus
Zonathyris
Zophostrophia
Zugmayerella
Zugmayeria
Zygonaria
Zygatrypa
Zygospira
Zygospirella

See also
List of brachiopod species
Taxonomy of the Brachiopoda
Evolution of brachiopods

References 

List of genera